The 2018 Nordic Opening or the third Lillehammer Triple was the 9th edition of the Nordic Opening, an annual cross-country skiing mini-tour event. The three-day event was the second competition round of the 2018–19 FIS Cross-Country World Cup.

Overall leadership

The results in the overall standings were calculated by adding each skier's finishing times on each stage. On the sprint stage, the winners were awarded 30 bonus seconds, no bonus seconds were awarded on stages two and three. The skier with the lowest cumulative time would be the overall winner of the Nordic Opening.

A total of CHF 240,000, both genders included, was awarded in cash prizes in the race. The overall winners of the Nordic Opening received CHF 22,500, with the second and third placed skiers getting CHF 17,500 and CHF 11,000 respectively. All finishers in the top 20 were awarded money.  CHF 5,000 was given to the winners of each stage of the race, with smaller amounts given to places second and third.

Overall standings

Stages

Stage 1
30 November 2018
 The skiers qualification times count in the overall standings. Bonus seconds are awarded to the 30 skiers that qualifies for the quarter-finals, distributed as following:
 Final: 30–27–24–23–22–21
 Semi-final: 16–15–14–13–12–11
 Quarter-final: 5–5–5–4–4–4–4–4–3–3–3–3–3–2–2–2–2–2

Stage 2
1 December 2018
No bonus seconds were awarded on this stage.

Stage 3
2 December 2018
The race for "Winner of the Day" counts for 2018–19 FIS Cross-Country World Cup points. No bonus seconds were awarded on this stage.

World Cup points distribution
The overall winners were awarded 200 points. The winners of each of the three stages are awarded 50 points. The maximum number of points an athlete can earn is therefore 350 points.

References

Sources
 

2018–19 FIS Cross-Country World Cup
2018
2018 in cross-country skiing
November 2018 sports events in Europe
December 2018 sports events in Europe